The year 1998 is the 10th year in the history of Shooto, a mixed martial arts promotion based in Japan. In 1998 Shooto held 10 events beginning with Shooto: Las Grandes Viajes 1.

Title fights

Events list

Shooto: Las Grandes Viajes 1

Shooto: Las Grandes Viajes 1 was an event held on January 17, 1998, at Korakuen Hall in Tokyo, Japan.

Results

Shooto: Las Grandes Viajes 2

Shooto: Las Grandes Viajes 2 was an event held on March 1, 1998, at Korakuen Hall in Tokyo, Japan.

Results

Shooto: Gig '98 1st

Shooto: Gig '98 1st was an event held on April 10, 1998, at Kitazawa Town Hall in Tokyo, Japan.

Results

Shooto: Shoot the Shooto XX

Shooto: Shoot the Shooto XX was an event held on April 26, 1998, at Yokohama Arena in Yokohama, Kanagawa, Japan.

Results

Shooto: Las Grandes Viajes 3

Shooto: Las Grandes Viajes 3 was an event held on May 13, 1998, at Korakuen Hall in Tokyo, Japan.

Results

Shooto: Gig '98 2nd

Shooto: Gig '98 2nd was an event held on July 18, 1998, at Kitazawa Town Hall in Tokyo, Japan.

Results

Shooto: Las Grandes Viajes 4

Shooto: Las Grandes Viajes 4 was an event held on July 29, 1998, at Korakuen Hall in Tokyo, Japan.

Results

Shooto: Las Grandes Viajes 5

Shooto: Las Grandes Viajes 5 was an event held on August 29, 1998, at Korakuen Hall in Tokyo, Japan.

Results

Shooto: Shooter's Dream

Shooto: Shooter's Dream was an event held on September 18, 1998, at Kitazawa Town Hall in Setagaya, Tokyo, Japan.

Results

Shooto: Las Grandes Viajes 6

Shooto: Las Grandes Viajes 6 was an event held on November 27, 1998, at Korakuen Hall in Tokyo, Japan.

Results

See also 
 Shooto
 List of Shooto champions
 List of Shooto Events

References

Shooto events
1998 in mixed martial arts